Raadha Aur Seeta is a 1979 Bollywood drama film directed by Vijay Kapoor and produced by Tarachand Barjatya.

Plot
Young Shekhar Verma works in the factory of Raadha's father. Radha falls in love with Shekhar. On the other hand, Shekhar loves Seeta Mathur, who is childhood friend of Raadha. Raadha and Seeta do not divulge their love interest to each other.

Cast
Rita Bhaduri as Raadha S. Saxena
Abha Dhulia as Seeta Mathur
Arun Govil as Shekhar Verma
Rajendra Nath as Dholuram 
Madan Puri as Shankar Saxena 
Leela Mishra as Bua (Shankar's sister)  
Urmila Bhatt as Mrs. R.B. Verma   
Jagdeep as Bhagwandas
Pinchoo Kapoor as Raj Bahadur Verma 
Roopesh Kumar as Eve-teaser 
Hari Shivdasani as Dholuram's boss
Ritu Kamal as Leela 
Savita Bajaj as College Lecturer

Music

The music is by Ravindra Jain. Lyrics also by Ravindra Jain for all the songs.

"Man Meet Aur Preet" - Hemlata
"Kaun Hai Aisa Jise Phulo Se" - Hemlata, Yesudas
"Log Aise Bhi Zamane Me" - Ravindra Jain
"Man Ki Baat Jab Hotho Pe" - Hemlata
"Man Ki Baat Jab Hotho Pe" (Duet) - Hemlata, Suresh Wadkar
"Man Meet Aur Preet Milte Hai" (Part 2) - Hemlata, Dilraj Kaur
"Man Meet Aur Preet Milte Hai" (Part 3) - Hemlata

References

External links
 

1979 films
1970s Hindi-language films
1979 drama films
Rajshri Productions films
Films scored by Ravindra Jain
Indian romantic drama films